Rajesh Pawar is an Indian politician and BJP leader from Nanded district. He defeated Vasantrao Balwantrao Chavan, sitting Congress MLA from Naigaon Assembly constituency in 2019 election.

References 

Maharashtra MLAs 2019–2024
People from Nanded district
Bharatiya Janata Party politicians from Maharashtra
1972 births
Living people